Jonathan Kolia Favreau (born October 19, 1966) is an American actor and filmmaker. As an actor, Favreau has appeared in films such as Rudy (1993), PCU (1994), Swingers (1996), Very Bad Things (1998), Deep Impact (1998), The Replacements (2000), Daredevil (2003), and The Break-Up (2006). He has also appeared in films such as Four Christmases (2008), Couples Retreat (2009), I Love You, Man (2009), People Like Us (2012), The Wolf of Wall Street (2013), Chef (2014), and several films created by Marvel Studios.

As a filmmaker, Favreau has been significantly involved with the Marvel Cinematic Universe. He directed, produced, and appeared as Happy Hogan in the films Iron Man (2008) and Iron Man 2 (2010). He also served as an executive producer for or appeared as the character in the films The Avengers (2012), Iron Man 3 (2013), Avengers: Age of Ultron (2015), Spider-Man: Homecoming (2017), Avengers: Infinity War (2018), Avengers: Endgame (2019), Spider-Man: Far From Home (2019), and Spider-Man: No Way Home (2021).

He has also directed the films Elf (2003), Zathura: A Space Adventure (2005), Cowboys & Aliens (2011), Chef (2014), The Jungle Book (2016), and The Lion King (2019). Favreau is the creator of the Star Wars Disney+ original series The Mandalorian (2019–present) as well as one of its executive producers and directors. He also serves as a writer and executive producer for its spin-off series The Book of Boba Fett. He produces films under his production company banner, Fairview Entertainment, and also presents the television cooking series The Chef Show.

Early life
Jonathan Kolia Favreau was born in Flushing, Queens, New York on October 19, 1966, the only child of Madeleine, an elementary school teacher who died of leukemia in 1979, and Charles Favreau, a special education teacher. His mother was Jewish (of Russian-Jewish descent), and his father is a Catholic of Italian and French-Canadian ancestry. Favreau dropped out of Hebrew school to pursue acting. However, following his mother's death, both sides of his family worked to ensure he had a Bar Mitzvah ceremony.

Favreau graduated from The Bronx High School of Science, a school for gifted students, in 1984 and attended Queens College from 1984 to 1987, before dropping out. His friend from college, Mitchell Pollack, said that Favreau went by the nickname "Johnny Hack" because of his abilities in the game Hacky Sack. He briefly worked for Bear Stearns on Wall Street before returning to Queens College for a semester in early 1988. He dropped out of college for good (a few credits shy of completing his degree), and moved to Chicago in the summer of 1988 to pursue a career in comedy. He performed at several Chicago improvisational theaters, including the ImprovOlympic and the Improv Institute.

Career

1992–2000: Early career 
While in Chicago, Favreau landed his first film role alongside Sean Astin as tutor D-Bob in the sleeper hit Rudy (1993). Favreau met Vince Vaughn – who played a small role in this film – during shooting. The next year, he appeared in the college film PCU alongside Jeremy Piven, and the 1994 episode of Seinfeld titled "The Fire" as Eric the Clown.

Favreau then moved to Los Angeles, where he made his breakthrough in 1996 as an actor-screenwriter with the film Swingers, which was also Vaughn's breakthrough role as the character Trent Walker, a foil to Favreau's heartbroken Mike Peters. In 1997, he appeared on the television sitcom Friends, portraying Pete Becker – Monica Geller's millionaire boyfriend who competes in the Ultimate Fighting Championship (UFC) – for several episodes. Favreau made appearances in the sketch-comedy series, Tracey Takes On... in both 1996 and 1997.

Favreau landed the role of Gus Partenza in Deep Impact (1998), and that same year rejoined Piven in Very Bad Things (1998). In 1999, he starred in the television film Rocky Marciano, based on the life of world heavyweight champion, Rocky Marciano. He later appeared in Love & Sex (2000), co-starring Famke Janssen. Favreau appeared in 2000's The Replacements as maniacal linebacker Daniel Bateman, and that same year he played himself in The Sopranos episode "D-Girl", as a Hollywood director who feigns interest in developing mob associate Christopher Moltisanti's screenplay in order to collect material for his own screenplay.

2001–2015: Actor–director

In 2001, he made his film directorial debut with another self-penned screenplay, Made. Made once again teamed him up with his Swingers co-star Vince Vaughn. Favreau also starred in a TV series called Dinner for Five, which aired on the cable TV channel IFC from 2001 to 2005.

He was a guest-director for an episode of the college dramedy Undeclared in 2001, and Favreau got some screen time as lawyer Foggy Nelson in the 2003 movie Daredevil (2003) (considerably more in the director's cut version). He also starred in The Big Empty (2003), directed by Steve Anderson. His character was John Person, an out of work actor given a strange mission to deliver a blue suitcase to a man named Cowboy in the desert. Favreau is credited as a screenwriter for the 2002 film The First $20 Million Is Always the Hardest.

In the fall of 2003, he scored his first financial success as a director of the hit comedy Elf starring Will Ferrell, Zooey Deschanel, James Caan, and Peter Dinklage. Also in 2003, Favreau had a small part in Something's Gotta Give (a film starring Diane Keaton and Jack Nicholson); Favreau played Leo, Harry Sanborn's (Nicholson) personal assistant, who visited Harry in the hospital. In 2005, Favreau directed the film adaptation of the children's book Zathura. It received positive reviews, but was not commercially successful. Favreau continued to make regular appearances in film and television. He reunited with friend Vaughn in the romantic comedy The Break-Up and appeared in My Name Is Earl as a reprehensible fast food manager. Favreau also made a guest appearance in Vaughn's Wild West Comedy Show.

Also in 2005, Favreau appeared as a guest judge and executive representative of Sony Corporation in week five of NBC primetime reality TV business show, The Apprentice. He was called upon to judge the efforts of the show's two teams of contestants, who were assigned the task of designing and building a float to publicize his 2005 Sony Pictures movie, Zathura: A Space Adventure.

On April 28, 2006, it was announced that Favreau was signed to direct the long-awaited Iron Man movie. Released on May 2, 2008, the film was a huge critical and commercial success, solidifying Favreau's reputation as a director.

Iron Man was the first Marvel-produced movie under their alliance with Paramount, and Favreau served as the director and an executive producer. During early scenes in Iron Man, Favreau appears as Tony Stark's driver, Happy Hogan. He wrote two issues of a planned mini-series for Marvel Knights titled Iron Man: Viva Las Vegas, that debuted in September 2008 before being canceled in November 2008. Favreau also directed and executive produced the film's sequel, Iron Man 2. Favreau said in December 2010 that he would not direct Iron Man 3 but remain an executive producer.

Favreau was the third director attached to John Carter, the film adaptation of Edgar Rice Burroughs' swashbuckling space hero. While he did not ultimately direct it, he did appear in a cameo in the film, as a bookie.

In 2008, he played Denver, a bully-type bigger brother to Vaughn in Four Christmases. Favreau co-starred in 2009's Couples Retreat, a comedy chronicling four couples who partake in therapy sessions at a tropical island resort, which he wrote. The film saw him co-star with Vaughn again, while Kristin Davis played his wife.

He voices the character Pre Vizsla, the leader of the Mandalorian Death Watch, in the animated series, Star Wars: The Clone Wars.

In September 2009, he signed up to direct Cowboys & Aliens based on the graphic novel of the same name created by Scott Mitchell Rosenberg. The science fiction Western film was released in 2011, starring Daniel Craig and Harrison Ford, and is considered to be a financial disappointment, taking $174.8 million in box office receipts on a $163 million budget and received mixed reviews, with critics generally praising its acting while criticizing other aspects.

In 2012, Favreau directed the pilot for the NBC show Revolution, and served as one of the show's executive producers, alongside J. J. Abrams.

In 2013, Favreau directed an episode (Season 9, Episode 16) of another NBC hit The Office.

In 2013, he filmed a pilot for a TV series based on the novel About a Boy, but set in San Francisco. He also directed the Destiny trailer "The Law of the Jungle".

In 2014, Favreau wrote, co-produced, directed, and starred in Chef. Favreau played a chef who, after a public altercation with a food critic, quits his job at a popular Los Angeles restaurant to operate a food truck with his young son. It co-stars Sofía Vergara, John Leguizamo, Scarlett Johansson, Oliver Platt, Bobby Cannavale and Dustin Hoffman, along with Robert Downey Jr. in a cameo role. Favreau wrote the script after directing several big-budget films, wanting to go "back to basics" and to create a film about cooking. It was well received by critics, who praised the direction, music, writing, story, and performances grossing $45 million against a production budget of $11 million.

2016–present: Franchise work 
In 2016, Favreau directed and produced the live-action adaptation of The Jungle Book, for Walt Disney Pictures, which was released on April 15, 2016, to critical and commercial acclaim.

In the same year, it was reported that Favreau would direct a CGI adaptation of Disney's The Lion King, marking his first time directing a musical. Donald Glover voiced Simba, and James Earl Jones reprised his role as Mufasa from the original film. The film was released in July 2019. On July 29, The Lion King surpassed The Jungle Book to become Favreau's highest-grossing film as director, while also surpassing the original film.  Simultaneous with his directorial projects, he worked as a consultant on 24 episodes of The Orville from 2017 to 2019.

He returned as Happy Hogan in the film Spider-Man: Homecoming (2017), and co-executive produced Avengers: Infinity War (2018). Favreau filmed a scene for Avengers: Infinity War, but was cut, ending up on the Blu-Ray release. In 2017, Favreau directed the pilot episode of CBS' Young Sheldon.

On March 8, 2018, Lucasfilm announced that Favreau would executive produce and write a live-action Star Wars television series, titled The Mandalorian, for Disney+. The series premiered on November 12, 2019, alongside the streaming service and was co-produced by Favreau's production company Golem Creations. Jon Favreau also lent his voice to the character of Paz Vizsla, who was portrayed by Tait Fletcher.

During that same year, Favreau appeared in Solo: A Star Wars Story voicing Rio Durant, "a very cool and important alien character" and member of Beckett's crew.

In the 2019 film Avengers: Endgame, Favreau reprised his role as Happy Hogan in a cameo near the end of the film. The film, directed by the Russo brothers, was executive-produced by Favreau. Avengers: Endgame was released on April 26, 2019. In 2019, Favreau also appeared in the sequel to Homecoming, Spider-Man: Far From Home.

In May of the same year, it was also announced that Favreau would co-host and executive produce a cooking show for Netflix along with co-host Roy Choi, called The Chef Show. It premiered in June 2019.

In December 2021, Favreau reprised his role as Happy Hogan in Spider-Man: No Way Home.

In May 2022, Favreau produced the documentary series Prehistoric Planet alongside the BBC Studios Natural History Unit for Apple TV+.

Future projects
In April 2016, it was reported that Favreau would return to direct the sequel to The Jungle Book, his critically acclaimed live-action adaptation of the animated film of the same name. Early pre-production of the sequel had begun by June 12, 2018, with Justin Marks, who wrote the previous film, having ended an early draft for the film.

Appearances
Favreau has a chapter giving advice in Tim Ferriss' book Tools of Titans.

Unreleased projects
A motion-captured animated film titled Neanderthals was in development at Sony Pictures Animation in the mid-2000s that Favreau would have written and produced, but the project was cancelled sometime in 2008 after four years in development.

In November 2010, it was reported that Favreau will direct a film titled Magic Kingdom, based on The Walt Disney Company's theme park of the same name. In July 2012, Favreau reported officially that he was working on the film. In 2014, he stated that he still had interest in the project, and that he could direct it after finishing filming The Jungle Book.

In November 2012, it was said that Favreau was being considered to direct Star Wars: The Force Awakens, along with David Fincher, Brad Bird, Matthew Vaughn and Ben Affleck, but J. J. Abrams was selected to direct the film. In June 2015, Favreau stated that although he would not be working on the Star Wars anthology films, he could work on future Star Wars movies at some point. Favreau later worked with the franchise on the live action series The Mandalorian.

In December 2013, Will Ferrell stated that he did not want to make a sequel to Elf. Despite this, during an interview in January 2016, Favreau stated that a sequel could possibly be made. The next month however, Ferrell reiterated that it was unlikely that the sequel would happen and that he still did not want to return to the role.

Personal life
Favreau married Joya Tillem, a physician, on November 24, 2000. The couple have a son, Max Favreau (who appeared as a boy in Iron Man 2 later reported to be retroactively a young Peter Parker in the MCU), and two daughters. Tillem is the niece of lawyer/talk show host Len Tillem.

Favreau credits the role-playing game Dungeons & Dragons with giving him "a really strong background in imagination, storytelling, understanding how to create tone and a sense of balance."

Golem Creations

Golem Creations Ltd. LLC is a television production company created by Jon Favreau on August 30, 2018.  In an interview with The Hollywood Reporter, Favreau cited his fascination with the overlap of technology and storytelling and that he gave the company its name because a golem was like technology; it could be used to protect or destroy if control was lost of it.  The company most recently produced The Mandalorian and The Book of Boba Fett television shows in partnership with Lucasfilm.

Filmography

Awards and recognition
In May 2019, it was announced that Favreau will be named a Disney Legend at the 2019 D23 Expo for his outstanding contributions to The Walt Disney Company.

On Monday, February 13, 2023, at 11:00 AM PT Jon Favreau, received the 2,746th star on the Hollywood Walk of Fame.

References

External links

 
 Jon Favreau's Guest DJ Project on KCRW KCRW Guest DJ set

1966 births
Living people
20th-century American male actors
21st-century American male actors
Action film directors
American male film actors
American male screenwriters
American male television actors
American male voice actors
American people of French-Canadian descent
American writers of Italian descent
American people of Russian-Jewish descent
Bear Stearns people
Film directors from New York City
Film producers from New York (state)
Jewish American male actors
Jewish American writers
Male actors from New York City
People from Flushing, Queens
Queens College, City University of New York alumni
Screenwriters from New York (state)
The Bronx High School of Science alumni
American male comedians
Writers from Queens, New York
21st-century American Jews
Showrunners
American people of Italian descent